Poggio San Lorenzo is a  (municipality) in the Province of Rieti in the Italian region of Latium, located about  northeast of Rome and about  south of Rieti.

Poggio San Lorenzo borders the following municipalities: Casaprota, Frasso Sabino, Monteleone Sabino, Torricella in Sabina.

See also
 Abatino Faunistic Park

References

Cities and towns in Lazio